Hungary competed at the 1980 Summer Olympics in Moscow, USSR. 263 competitors, 182 men and 81 women, took part in 151 events in 21 sports.

Medalists

Gold
 László Foltán and István Vaskuti — Canoeing, Men's C2 500m Canadian Pairs 
 Zoltán Magyar — Gymnastics, Men's Pommeled Horse 
 Károly Varga — Shooting, Men's Small-bore Rifle Prone 
 Sándor Wladár — Swimming, Men's 200m Backstroke 
 Péter Baczakó — Weightlifting, Men's Middle Heavyweight 
 Ferenc Kocsis — Wrestling, Men's Greco-Roman Welterweight 
 Norbert Növényi — Wrestling, Men's Greco-Roman Light Heavyweight

Silver
 István Joós and István Szabó — Canoeing, Men's K2 1000m Kayak Pairs 
 Ernõ Kolczonay — Fencing, Men's Épée Individual 
 Magda Maros — Fencing, Women's Foil Individual 
 Tamás Szombathelyi — Pentathlon, Men's Individual Competition
 László Horváth, Tibor Maracskó and Tamás Szombathelyi — Pentathlon, Men's Team Competition
 Zoltán Verrasztó — Swimming, Men's 200m Backstroke 
 Albán Vermes — Swimming, Men's 200m Breaststroke
 Lajos Rácz — Wrestling, Men's Greco-Roman Flyweight 
 István Tóth — Wrestling, Men's Greco-Roman Featherweight
 József Balla — Wrestling, Men's Freestyle Super Heavyweight

Bronze
 János Váradi — Boxing, Men's Flyweight
 István Lévai — Boxing, Men's Heavyweight
 Éva Rakusz and Mária Zakariás — Canoeing, Women's K2 500m Kayak Pairs 
 Imre Gedővári — Fencing, Men's Sabre Individual  
 Imre Gedővári, Pál Gerevich, Ferenc Hammang, György Nébald and Rudolf Nébald — Fencing, Men's Sabre Team 
 Edit Kovács, Magda Maros, Ildikó Schwarczenberger, Gertrúd Stefanek and Zsuzsanna Szőcs — Fencing, Women's Foil Team
 Ferenc Donáth, György Guczoghy, Zoltán Kelemen, Zoltán Magyar, Péter Kovács, and István Vámos — Gymnastics, Men's Team Combined Exercises 
 Tibor Kincses — Judo, Men's Extra Lightweight (60 kg)
 András Ozsvár — Judo, Men's Open Class
 Zoltán Verrasztó — Swimming, Men's 400m Individual Medley 
 György Szalai — Weightlifting, Heavyweight 
 Endre Molnár, István Szívós, Jr., Attila Sudár, György Gerandás, György Horkai, Gábor Csapó, István Kiss, István Udvardi, László Kuncz, Tamás Faragó, and Károly Hauszler — Water Polo, Men's Team Competition
 Ferenc Seres — Wrestling, Men's Greco-Roman Light Flyweight 
 István Kovács — Wrestling, Men's  Freestyle Middleweight 
 Szabolcs Detre and Zsolt Detre — Sailing, Men's Flying Dutchman

Archery

After missing the 1976 archery competition, Hungary returned in 1980. The nation was represented by two women and two men, including 1972 veteran Bela Nagy. Nagy placed 5th, only three points behind the bronze medallist.

Women's Individual Competition:
Judit Kovacs — 2323 points (→ 12th place)
Margit Szobi — 2216 points (→ 21st place)

Men's Individual Competition:
Bela Nagy — 2446 points (→ 5th place)
Istvan Balasz — 2241 points (→ 28th place)

Athletics

Men's 100 metres
 István Nagy
 Heat — 10.68 (→ did not advance)

 István Tatár
 Heat — 10.69 (→ did not advance)

Men's 200 metres
 Ferenc Kiss
 István Nagy

Men's 800 metres
 András Paróczai 
 Heat — 1:47.5
 Semifinals — 1:48.8 (→ did not advance)

Men's Marathon
 Ferenc Szekeres
 Final — 2:15:18 (→ 12th place)

Men's 400 m Hurdles
 József Szalai
 Heat — 50.23
 Semifinals — 51.06 (→ did not advance)

Men's 4 × 100 m Relay
István Tatár, István Nagy, László Babály, Sr., and Ferenc Kiss

Men's 20 km Walk
 János Szálas
 Final — 1:34:10.5 (→ 12th place)

Men's 50 km Walk
 László Sátor
 Final — 4:10:53 (→ 9th place)

Men's High Jump
Zoltán Társi
 Qualification — 2.18 m (→ did not advance)

István Gibicsár 
 Qualification — 2.15 m (→ did not advance)

Men's Long Jump
 László Szalma
 Qualification — 7.91 m
 Final — 8.13 m (→ 4th place)

 Béla Bakosi
 Qualification — 7.29 m (→ did not advance)

Men's Triple Jump
Béla Bakosi
 Qualification — 16.45 m
 Final — 16.47 m (→ 7th place)

Men's Javelin Throw
 Miklós Németh
 Qualification — 84.84 m
 Final — 82.40 m (→ 8th place)

 Ferenc Paragi
 Qualification — 88.76 m
 Final — 79.52 m (→ 10th place)

Women's 200 metres
Irén Orosz-Árva

Women's 400 metres
Ilona Pál 
Judit Forgács

Women's 100 m Hurdles
Xénia Siska 
 Heat — 13.23
 Semifinal — did not finish (→ did not advance)

Women's 4×400 metres Relay
Irén Orosz-Árva, Judit Forgács, Éva Tóth, Ilona Pál, and Ibolya Petrika

Women's High Jump
Andrea Mátay 
 Qualification — 1.88 m
 Final — 1.85 m (→ 10th place)

Women's Long Jump
 Mária Pap
 Qualifying Round — 6.41 m (→ did not advance, 14th place)

 Margit Papp
 Qualifying Round — 6.32 m (→ did not advance, 16th place)

Women's Discus Throw
 Ágnes Herczegh
 Qualification — 57.80 m
 Final — 55.06 m (→ 12th place)

 Katalin Csőke
 Qualification — 57.38 m (→ did not advance)

Women's Javelin Throw
Mária Janák
 Qualification — 57.80 m (→ did not advance)

Women's Pentathlon
 Margit Papp — 4562 points (→ 5th place)
 100 metres — 13.96s
 Shot Put — 14.94m 
 High Jump — 1.74m 
 Long Jump — 6.35m 
 800 metres — 2:15.80

Basketball

Boxing

Men's Light Flyweight (– 48 kg)
György Gedó
 First Round — Bye
 Second Round — Defeated Charles Lubulwa (Uganda) after referee stopped contest in first round
 Quarter Finals — Lost to Hipolito Ramos (Cuba) on points (0-5) 

Men's Flyweight (– 51 kg)
János Váradi → Bronze Medal
 First Round — Bye
 Second Round — Defeated Rabiraj Thapa (Nepal) after referee stopped contest in first round 
 Quarter Finals — Defeated Daniel Radu (Romania) on points (4-1) 
 Semi Finals — Lost to Viktor Miroshnichenko (Soviet Union) on points (4-1)

Men's Bantamweight (– 54 kg)
Sándor Farkas
 First Round — Bye
 Second Round — Lost to Juan Hernández (Cuba) on points (1-4)

Men's Featherweight (– 57 kg)
Róbert Gönczi
 First Round — Bye
 Second Round — Lost to Titi Cercel (Romania) on points (0-5)

Men's Lightweight (– 60 kg)
Tibor Dezamits
 First Round — Defeated Alphonse Matoubela (Congo) on points (5-0) 
 Second Round — Lost to Yordan Lesov (Bulgaria) on points (1-4)

Men's Light-Welterweight (– 63,5 kg)
Imre Bacskai
 First Round — Defeated Paul Kamela Fogang (Cameroon) on points (4-1)
 Second Round — Lost to Serik Konakbayev (Soviet Union) after retiring in second round

Men's Welterweight (– 67 kg)
Imre Csjef
 First Round — Lost to Paul Rasamimanana (Madagascar) after knock-out in second round 

Men's Light Heavyweight (– 81 kg)
Csaba Kuzma
 First Round — Lost to Michael Madsen (Denmark) on points (3-2) 

Men's Heavyweight (+ 81 kg)
István Lévai → Bronze Medal
 First Round — Bye
 Quarter Finals — Defeated Anders Eklund (Sweden) on points (4-1)
 Semi Finals — Lost to Teófilo Stevenson (Cuba) on points (0-5)

Canoeing

Cycling

Ten cyclists represented Hungary in 1980.

Individual road race
 András Takács
 Zoltán Halász
 György Szuromi
 László Halász

Team time trial
 Tamás Csathó
 László Halász
 Zoltán Halász
 András Takács

Sprint
 László Morcz

Team pursuit
 Ervin Dér
 Csaba Pálinkás
 Zsigmond Sarkadi Nagy
 Gábor Szűcs

Diving

Men's Springboard
Károly Némedi
 Preliminary Round — 475.17 points (→ 17th place, did not advance)

Men's Platform
Károly Némedi
 Preliminary Round — 429.75 points (→ 14th place, did not advance)

Equestrian

Fencing

18 fencers, 13 men and 5 women, represented Hungary in 1980.

Men's foil
 István Szelei
 László Demény
 András Papp

Men's team foil
 István Szelei, Ernő Kolczonay, András Papp, László Demény, Jenő Pap

Men's épée
 Ernő Kolczonay, István Osztrics, László Pető

Men's team épée
 Ernő Kolczonay, István Osztrics, László Pető, Jenő Pap, Péter Takács

Men's sabre
 Imre Gedővári
 Pál Gerevich
 György Nébald

Men's team sabre
 Imre Gedővári, Pál Gerevich, Ferenc Hammang, Rudolf Nébald, György Nébald

Women's foil
 Magda Maros
 Ildikó Schwarczenberger-Tordasi
 Gertrúd Stefanek

Women's team foil
 Magda Maros, Edit Kovács, Ildikó Schwarczenberger-Tordasi, Zsuzsa Szőcs, Gertrúd Stefanek

Gymnastics

Handball

Men's Team Competition
Preliminary Round (Group A)
 Drew with Poland (20-20)
 Drew with East Germany (14-14)
 Defeated Spain (20-17)
 Defeated Denmark (16-15)
 Defeated Cuba (26-22)
Classification Match
 Bronze Medal Match: Lost to Romania (18-20) → 4th place

Team Roster
 Béla Bartalos
 László Szabó
 Péter Kovács
 Sándor Vass
 János Fodor
 István Szilágyi
 József Kenyeres
 László Jánovszki
 Ambrus Lele
 Ernő Gubányi
 Zsolt Kontra
 Alpár Jegenyés
 Árpád Pál
 Miklós Kovacsics

Judo

Modern pentathlon

Three male pentathletes represented Hungary in 1980. They won a team silver and Tamás Szombathelyi won an individual silver.

Men's Individual competition:
Tamás Szombathelyi — 5502pts, Silver Medal
Tibor Maracskó — 5279pts, 5th place
László Horváth — 5131pts, 19th place

Men's Team Competition:
Szombathelyi, Maracskó, and Horváth — 15912 pts, Silver Medal

Rowing

Sailing

Shooting

Swimming

Men's Competition
János Dzvonyár
András Hargitay
Gábor Mészáros
Sándor Nagy
Róbert Rudolf
Csaba Sós
Albán Vermes
Zoltán Verrasztó
Sándor Wladár 
Zoltán Wladár

Women's Competition
Ágnes Fodor
Éva Miklósfalvy

Women's 100 m Breaststroke
Gabriella Kindl
 Heats — 1:14.33 (→ did not advance)Women's 400m Individual MedleyKlara Gulyas
 Heats — did not start (→ did not advance)

Volleyball

Women's Team CompetitionPreliminary Round (Group B) Defeated Brazil (3-2)
 Lost to Romania (2-3)
 Defeated Bulgaria (3-1)Semi Finals Lost to Soviet Union (0-3)Bronze Medal Game Lost to Bulgaria (2-3) → 4th placeTeam Roster Julianna Szalonna
 Éva Szalay
 Gyöngyi Bardi
 Ágnes Juhász
 Lucia Bánhegyi
 Gabriella Fekete
 Emőke Szegedi-Vargha
 Emerencia Király
 Ágnes Torma
 Erzsébet Varga
 Gabriella Lengyel
 Bernadett Kőszegi

Water polo

Men's Team CompetitionPreliminary Round (Group A) Drew with Romania (6-6)
 Defeated Netherlands (5-3)
 Defeated Greece (8-5)Final Round (Group A) Lost to Soviet Union (4-5)
 Lost to Yugoslavia (7-8)
 Defeated Spain (6-5)
 Defeated Cuba (7-5)
 Defeated Netherlands (8-7) →  Bronze MedalTeam Roster'''
 Endre Molnár
 István Szívós, Jr.
 Attila Sudár
 György Gerandás
 György Horkai
 Gábor Csapó
 István Kiss
 István Udvardi
 László Kuncz
 Tamás Faragó
 Károly Hauszler

Weightlifting

Wrestling

References

Nations at the 1980 Summer Olympics
1980 Summer Olympics
1980 in Hungarian sport